Sigrid Nunez is an American writer, best known for her novels. Her seventh novel, The Friend, won the 2018 National Book Award for Fiction. She is on the faculty of the MFA Creative Writing Program at Hunter College (CUNY).

Biography

Sigrid Nunez was born and raised in New York City, the daughter of a German mother and a Chinese-Panamanian father. She received her BA from Barnard College (1972) and her MFA from Columbia University (1975), after which she worked for a time as an editorial assistant at The New York Review of Books. Nunez has published eight novels, including  A Feather on the Breath of God, The Last of Her Kind, The Friend, and, most recently, What Are You Going Through. She is also the author of Sempre Susan: A Memoir of Susan Sontag. Her ninth novel, The Vulnerables, will be published in November, 2023.

Among the journals to which Nunez has contributed are The New York Times, The New York Review of Books, The Paris Review, Harper's, McSweeney's, The Believer, The Threepenny Review, the London Review of Books, and The Wall Street Journal. Her work has also appeared in several anthologies, including four Pushcart Prize volumes and four anthologies of Asian-American literature. One of her short stories was selected for The Best American Short Stories 2019. Nunez, a Fellow of the John Simon Guggenheim Memorial Foundation, is also the recipient of a Whiting Writer’s Award, a Berlin Prize Fellowship, the Rosenthal Foundation Award and the Rome Prize in Literature. Nunez is a member of the American Academy of Arts and Letters. She has taught at Columbia, Princeton, Boston University, and the New School, and has been a visiting writer or writer in residence at Amherst, Smith, Baruch, Vassar, Syracuse, and the University of California, Irvine, among others. Nunez has also been on the faculty of the Bread Loaf Writers’ Conference and of several other writers’ conferences across the country. Her work has been translated into thirty languages. She lives in New York City.

Book synopses

 In A Feather on the Breath of God (1995), "a young woman looks back to the world of her immigrant parents: a Chinese-Panamanian father and a German mother, who meet in postwar Germany and settle in New York City. Growing up in a housing project in the 1950s and 1960s, the narrator escapes into dreams inspired both by her parents’ stories and by her own reading and, for a time, into the otherworldly life of ballet." The New York Times described Nunez's debut as "A forceful novel by a writer of uncommon talent.”
 Naked Sleeper (1996) is "a novel about the inescapable and sometimes unendurable complexities of love and the family drama," in which a woman falls into an extramarital affair and attempts to understand the father who abandoned her as a child.
 Mitz: The Marmoset of Bloomsbury (1998) is a mock biography of a pet marmoset belonging to Leonard and Virginia Woolf. NPR described Mitz as “[a] wry, supremely intelligent literary gem about devotion.”
 For Rouenna (2001). “Now in her fourth and perhaps best novel to date—about a writer haunted by her brief friendship with a former Vietnam combat nurse—Nunez revisits familiar Proustian territory with a frightening rigor.”
 The Last of Her Kind (2006) follows the arc of a friendship between two women from different socioeconomic backgrounds who meet as roommates at Barnard College in 1968. Nunez has said that she wanted to write about the sixties by imagining the lives of "specific individuals who happened to come of age in that revolutionary time." Andrew O'Hehir called it “perhaps the finest [social novel] yet written about that peculiar generation of young Americans who believed their destiny was to shape history.”
 In Salvation City (2010), a thirteen-year-old boy is orphaned in a global flu pandemic and sent to live with an evangelical pastor and his wife. “Salvation City is a story of love, betrayal, and forgiveness. It is about spiritual and moral growth, and the consolation of art.” Gary Shteyngart has said that the novel “makes one reconsider the ordering of our world.”
 Sempre Susan: A Memoir of Susan Sontag (2011). In 1976, while recovering from surgery, Sontag hired Nunez to type her correspondence. Nunez began dating Sontag’s son, David Rieff, and moved into the Upper West Side apartment that mother and son were sharing at the time. “This detailed, nuanced account of the more private side of a complex, contradictory public figure is told with even-handed good humor and more than a little compassion. Utterly absorbing.” — Lydia Davis
 The Friend (2018). After her mentor and lifelong friend commits suicide, a writer inherits his Great Dane. The Friend is both a “contemplation of writing and the loss of integrity in our literary life” and, in the words of Cathleen Schine, “the most original canine love story since My Dog Tulip.” It won the 2018 National Book Award and was a finalist for the 2019 Simpson/Joyce Carol Oates Literary Prize. The Friend was a New York Times bestseller. It was short listed for the 2020 International Dublin Literary Award. In France, it was longlisted in the category of foreign fiction for the 2019 Prix Femina and selected as a finalist for the 2019 Prix du Meilleure Livre Étranger.
 What Are You Going Through (2020). A woman agrees to help a terminally ill friend by going away with her and seeing her through the last days of her life. The friend is planning to take a euthanasia drug rather than let cancer take its course. "It’s as good as The Friend, if not better." — Dwight Garner

Bibliography

Books

What Are You Going Through. New York: Riverhead Books. 2020 .
The Vulnerables. New York: Riverhead Books. 2023  ISBN 978-0593715512.

Selected stories

"Imagination." The Sun, April 2012.
"Philosophers." Conjunctions: 58, Spring 2012.
"Worried Sisters." Harper's, September 2012.

Selected essays 

"Suddenly Susan" (adaptation from Sempre Susan). The New York Times, February 25, 2011.
"Love and Fiction" (excerpt from Little Star #4). littlestarjournal.com, December 12, 2012.
 "Shakespeare for Survivors" (review of Station Eleven, a novel, by Emily St. John Mandel). The New York Times Book Review, September 12, 2014.
"Two Memoirs Celebrate Muses With Four Legs" (review of two memoirs: Afterglow by Eileen Myles and Fetch by Nicole J. Georges). The New York Times Book Review, September 28, 2017.
"'Sight' and The Pleasures of Overthinking Motherhood" (review of Sight, a novel, by Jesse Greengrass). newyorker.com, August 22, 2018.
"Leonard Michaels Was a Cat Person" (introduction to A Cat, a novel, by Leonard Michaels). Paris Review Daily, November 14, 2018.
"Sex and Sincerity" (review of Cleanness, a novel, by Garth Greenwell). The New York Review of Books, June 11, 2020.
"Disorders of the Heart" (review of To Be a Man, a short story collection, by Nicole Krauss). The New York Review of Books, November 5, 2020.

References

External links
 
Merle Rubin's review of The Last of Her Kind in The Wall Street Journal, December 31, 2005.
Dwight Garner's review of The Friend in The New York Times, February 5, 2018.
Laura Kipnis's review of The Friend in The New York Review of Books, June 28, 2018.
"Reading from  The Friend  by Sigrid Nunez." Youtube, November 16, 2018.
"Sigrid Nunez accepts the National Book Award for Fiction," Youtube, November 15, 2018.
Interview with Scott Simon on NPR's Weekend Edition, November 24, 2018.
Profile of Nunez in The New York Times, December 13, 2018.
Interview with Terry Gross on Fresh Air, January 24, 2019.
Dwight Garner's review of What Are You Going Through in The New York Times, August 31, 2020.
Merve Emre’s review of What Are You Going Through in The New Yorker, September 7, 2020.
International Dublin Literary Award Shortlist podcast interview with Jessica Traynor, October 16, 2020.
Interview with Terry Gross on Fresh Air, October 21, 2020.

1951 births
Living people
20th-century American novelists
21st-century American novelists
21st-century American short story writers
American essayists
American people of German descent
American novelists of Chinese descent
American people of Panamanian descent
American women writers of Chinese descent
American women novelists
American women short story writers
Columbia University School of the Arts alumni
Writers from Manhattan
Barnard College alumni
Amherst College faculty
Smith College faculty
Columbia University faculty
The New School faculty
MacDowell Colony fellows
Novelists from New York (state)
20th-century American women writers
American women academics
21st-century American women writers